Shin Sung-woo (born Shin Dong-yoon; April 19, 1968) is a South Korean rock singer and actor. He was very popular as a rock star in the 90s with his song "Seoshi". He then went into acting, stage/musical plays and up to this time has been active in both.

Discography

Solo artist 
내일을 향해 Towards Tomorrow (1992)
Eight Smiles of Klein (1993)
Shinsungwoo 003 (1994)
For (1995)
Mauve (1998)
Identity (2000)
2002 Shin Sung-woo (compilation album, 2002)
"I Swear"  (track from First Love OST, 2003)
遭遇 (조우) Encounter (compilation album, 2006)
"To an Old Friend"  (track from Telecinema Project Vol.2, 2009)
"Stagnant"  (track from Warrior Baek Dong-soo OST, 2011)

Geenie 
Cool World (1995)
Elephant (1996)

Filmography

Television series 
Love Story (SBS, 2000) (episode 6: "Miss Hip-Hop and Mr. Rock")
Man in Crisis (MBC, 2002)
MBC Best Theater "Flower"  (MBC, 2003)
Country Princess (MBC, 2003)
First Love (SBS, 2003)
Beautiful Temptation (KBS2, 2004)
Midnight DJ (SBS, 2004)
Tropical Nights in December (MBC, 2004)
Beating Heart (MBC, 2005)
Rehearsal (MBC, 2005)
MBC Best Theater "A Sweet Villainess Has Come to Me"  (MBC, 2005) 
MBC Best Theater "May, June"  (MBC, 2005)
Special of My Life (MBC, 2006)
Super Rookie Ranger  (MBC, 2006)
It's Okay Because I Love You  (KBS2, 2007)
The Secret of Coocoo Island (MBC, 2008)
Home Sweet Home (MBC, 2010)
Mom (MBC, 2015-2016)
Moorim School: Saga of the Brave (KBS2, 2016)
Dear My Friends (tvN, 2016)
The Great Seducer (MBC, 2018)
The Penthouse: War in Life 3 (SBS, 2021) / as Clark Lee  Cameo (Episode 7) 
The Murderer's Shopping List (tvN, 2022) / as Young-chun

Film  
Detective Mr. Gong (2006)
After the Banquet (2009)

Variety show 
Roommate (SBS, 2014) - season 1 cast member
Real Life Men and Women (MBN, 2018) - season 1, cast member

Musical theatre 
Dracula (1998) 
Rock Hamlet (2000) 
Rock of Ages (2010)
Jack the Ripper (2011-2014)
The Three Musketeers (2011-2014) 
Mozart, the Rock Opera (2012)
Gone with the Wind (2014-2015)
Chess (2015)
 Jack the Ripper (2021–2022) as Jack
 The Three Musketeers (2022) as Athos
Dracula (2022–2023)  as Dracula

References

External links 
 
 Shin Sung-woo Fan Cafe at Daum
 
 
 

1968 births
Living people
People from Seosan
Rock songwriters
20th-century South Korean male singers
21st-century South Korean male singers
20th-century South Korean male actors
21st-century South Korean male actors
South Korean rock singers
South Korean male singer-songwriters
South Korean male film actors
South Korean male television actors
South Korean male musical theatre actors
South Korean male stage actors
Chung-Ang University alumni